The Kirar is a Hindu agricultural caste whose traditional occupation is cultivation. They originated in Kiserkot  of Jaisalmer and migrated to different parts of India. Singh noted that, they were a similar group like Kol and Bhil, and lived a hunter-gatherer lifestyle. Now they have settled down in different areas where agriculture is their main occupation. Kirar has three subgroups: Karod, Dhakad and Dharod Kirar. In local caste hierarchy they come next to Brahmin, Jain and Rajput. They accept food from the upper castes however the upper castes do not accept food from Kirar. The Kirar are educationally backward. In 1966, the All India Kirar Samaj Sangh was established. The organization promotes community members' financial well-being and benefits. They have submitted a memorandum requesting that they be added to  the list of Scheduled Castes.

The Kirars are classified as Other Backward Classes (OBCs) category in the Indian states of Rajasthan, and Madhya Pradesh.

Notable people
Shivraj Singh Chouhan, incumbent Chief Minister of Madhya Pradesh
Thakur Malkhan Singh
Muskan Kirar

References

Indian castes
Social groups of Rajasthan
Social groups of Madhya Pradesh